Anthony Howe Browne (born 19 January 1967) is a British politician who has served as the Member of Parliament (MP) for South Cambridgeshire since the 2019 general election. He is a member of the Conservative Party.

Browne was previously a journalist at The Times, BBC and The Observer; an adviser to Boris Johnson when he was Mayor of London; chief executive of the British Bankers' Association and chairman of the UK Government's Regulatory Policy Committee. He sat on the Boards of the International Banking Federation, the European Banking Federation and TheCityUK, and a range of financial technology companies.

Early life

Browne was born in Mill Road Maternity Hospital in Cambridge to parents Patrick and Gerd Browne. He went to Fowlmere Primary School, The Perse School and Hills Road Sixth Form College in Cambridge, and then studied mathematics at Trinity Hall, Cambridge, receiving a BA (Hons) in 1988.

Career

Journalism

Browne began his career as a journalist. He worked for the BBC as a researcher for The Money Programme from 1993 to 1994, before becoming a broadcast journalist at Business Breakfast from 1994 to 1995.

He was business reporter and economics correspondent for the BBC (1993–1998); economics correspondent, health editor and environment correspondent for The Observer newspaper (1998–2002); and environment editor, Europe correspondent, and chief political correspondent for The Times (2002–2007). When Europe correspondent for The Times, he covered the enlargement of the EU to Eastern Europe, and the appointment of Peter Mandelson as European Commissioner. He also reported for The Times from Iraq after the fall of Saddam Hussein.

Browne was a columnist for City AM and one of the founding columnists of the website ConservativeHome. As Environment Editor of the Observer, Browne broke the exclusive that 1999 was the hottest year of the second millennium.
Browne was in New York on 11 September 2001, and covered the terrorist attack on the Twin Towers for The Guardian and its sister paper, The Observer.

Browne wrote in 2003 that immigration from Africa had become the main cause of new HIV infections in the UK. In an article the Spectator he suggested that the government's policy of mass migration would claim lives due to "letting in too many germs" and that reducing immigration would have more of an impact on public health than recommending that people use condoms.

Think tanks

Browne was Director of Policy Exchange, the largest centre-right think tank in the UK, where he succeeded the founding director Nick Boles. He ran Policy Exchange for eighteen months, during which time it doubled in size, but attracted criticism that it came too close to Conservative leader David Cameron.

Browne has written and contributed to various publications, including a book on whether Britain should join the European single currency, which entered the Sunday Times best-seller list; a pamphlet published by Civitas: The Institute for the Study of Civil Society discussing mass immigration which won Prospect magazine's think tank publication of the year award in 2003; and a Joseph Rowntree Foundation book on social evils; and a report for the think tank Open Europe supporting subsidiarity in the EU.

Politics

Browne was Policy Director for Economic Development for Boris Johnson, the Mayor of London, from 2008 to 2011. He was in charge of economic and business policy for London, sitting on the board of the London Development Agency, as an observer on the London Skills and Employment Board, and TheCityUK, which represents UK financial services. He was also chairman of the Mayor's Digital Advisory Board. Browne was the manifesto director for Boris Johnson's successful re-election campaign from 2011 to 2012.

On 20 July 2019, Browne was announced as the Conservative parliamentary candidate for South Cambridgeshire. Labour called for Boris Johnson to reject him as a candidate after accusing him of displaying "disgusting racism" in his journalism in the early 2000s. In an interview with the Cambridge Independent on 24 July 2019 to discuss his selection, Browne sought to distance himself from the views he had expressed as a journalist, when he claimed in The Spectator that third world immigrants bring germs into the country. When asked about the statements, he said "I went through a phase as a young journalist trying to get attention and it is not language I would use now. I regret saying it."

Browne was elected as member for South Cambridgeshire in December 2019 with a majority of 2,904. He was later elected as a member of the Treasury Select Committee and Chairman of the All Party Parliamentary Group of the Environment in 2020  and serves as a member of the a Public Accounts Commission. In September 2022, he was appointed as Parliamentary Private Secretary to the Department for Transport.

Lobbyist

After working for Boris Johnson, Browne became Morgan Stanley's head of government relations for Europe, the Middle East and Africa.

On 1 September 2012, he left Morgan Stanley to become chief executive of the British Bankers' Association, where he remained until 2017.

British Bankers' Association

Browne was appointed to the BBA in June 2012, two weeks before the LIBOR scandal broke. Marcus Agius, the chairman of the BBA who appointed Browne, promptly resigned.

Browne was responsible for implementing reforms of LIBOR proposed by a review lead by Martin Wheatley, the then head of the Financial Conduct Authority. Browne then worked with a government-appointed tendering committee chaired by Baroness Hogg to transfer operation of LIBOR from the BBA. Responsibility for the operation of LIBOR was transferred from the BBA to NYSE Euronext in January 2014. As part of the ensuing Parliamentary Commission on Banking Standards, chaired by Andrew Tyrie, Browne co-ordinated the industry to establish the Banking Standards Board.

Browne also set up the BBA's first Consumer Panel. In the wake of the 2016 referendum on Brexit, Browne warned, in an article in The Observer newspaper, that British-based banks were about to relocate operations to the EU, with their hands "quivering over the relocate button".

In April 2017, he announced he was stepping down after five years as CEO, when the BBA merged with five other trade associations to form UK Finance.

Personal life 
Anthony Browne is married Paula Higgins, the CEO and founder of HomeOwners Alliance. The couple have a son and daughter. Browne lists his recreations as "walking, running, climbing, eating, drinking, helping caterpillars turn into butterflies".

Publications
The Euro – Should Britain Join: Yes or No? (Icon Books, 2001)
NHS Reform: Towards Consensus? (Adam Smith Institute, 2002)
Do We Need Mass Immigration? (Civitas, 2002)
The Retreat of Reason – Political Correctness and the Corruption of Public Debate in Modern Britain (Civitas, 2006)
contributor Contemporary Social Evils (Joseph Rowntree Foundation, 2009)
The Case for European Localism, with Mats Persson (Open Europe, 2011)

References

External links

Living people
1967 births
British political journalists
UK MPs 2019–present
Conservative Party (UK) MPs for English constituencies
British people of Irish descent
British people of Norwegian descent
20th-century British journalists
21st-century British journalists
People from Cambridge
People educated at The Perse School
Alumni of Trinity Hall, Cambridge